Four (stylized as four) is the fourth album by American rock band Blues Traveler, released on September 13, 1994. Blues Traveler broke into the mainstream following the release of four.

four peaked at No. 8 on the Billboard 200 albums chart and is most known for its hits "Run-Around" and "Hook", which charted at No. 8 and 23, respectively, on the Billboard Hot 100. Both songs also charted in the top 20 on the Mainstream Rock and Modern Rock charts. According to the RIAA, the album is certified as 6× Platinum (6 million copies sold in the U.S.). "Run-Around" won the 1995 Grammy Award for Best Rock Performance by a Duo or Group.

Track listing
"Run-Around" (John Popper) – 4:40
"Stand" (Popper) – 5:19
"Look Around" (Popper) – 5:42
"Fallible" (Chan Kinchla, Popper) – 4:47
"The Mountains Win Again" (Bobby Sheehan) – 5:06
"Freedom" (Popper, Sheehan) – 4:01
"Crash & Burn" (Kinchla, Popper) – 2:59
"Price to Pay" (Kinchla, Popper) – 5:17
"Hook" (Popper) – 4:49
"The Good, the Bad and the Ugly" (Kinchla, Popper, Sheehan, Brendan Hill) – 1:55
"Just Wait" (Popper) – 5:34
"Brother John" (Kinchla, Popper, Sheehan) – 6:38

Personnel
Blues Traveler
Brendan Hill – percussion, drums
Chan Kinchla – electric and acoustic guitar, mandolin, backing vocals on "Brother John"
John Popper – vocals, harmonica, 12-string guitar on "Look Around"
Bobby Sheehan – bass guitar, backing vocals on "Brother John"

Additional musicians
Adam Brody – backing vocals
Warren Haynes – slide guitar on "The Mountains Win Again"
Bashiri Johnson – percussion
Chuck Leavell – piano, keyboards
Jono Manson – vocals on "Brother John"
Paul Shaffer – keyboards on "Stand"
Pete Kovachevich – sitar, tambura

Technical personnel
Greg Arnold – assistant engineering
Michael Barbiero – production, engineering
John Darren Greene – cover art
Steve Thompson – production

Charting singles
"Run-Around" peaked at No. 2 on the Adult Top 40 chart in 1995, and "Hook" peaked at No. 8 on the Mainstream Top 40 chart in 1996.

Charts

Weekly charts

Year-end charts

Certifications

Notes

Blues Traveler albums
1994 albums
A&M Records albums